Lieutenant William Benson Craig  (2 August 1896 – 26 September 1918) was a Canadian flying ace during World War I. He was credited with eight aerial victories over German fighter planes.

Early life
William Craig Benson was born in Smiths Falls, Ontario, Canada on 2 August 1896; his father was Richard Craig. He was working as a clerk when he enlisted in the 73rd Field Artillery Battery of the Canadian Expeditionary Force on 21 May 1917. He was five feet four inches tall, with black hair, brown eyes, and a swarthy complexion.

World War I
Craig transferred to the Royal Naval Air Service and was posted to 4 Naval Squadron as a Sopwith Camel pilot in May 1918. He scored his first aerial victories over German fighter planes on 15 August 1918, and in just over a month, ran his total to eight, all against fighters. On 26 September 1918, two days after his final victory, he was killed in action off-shore of Blankenberge, Belgium. He was posthumously awarded the Distinguished Flying Cross on 5 October 1918, though it would not be gazetted until 1 November 1918, ten days before war's end:

Whilst acting temporarily as flight leader on one day last month he personally destroyed three enemy machines, and the remainder of his flight accounted for three more. Lt. Craig has been engaged in numerous air battles, and always displays fine spirit, ability and determination in carrying out his duties. He has personally brought down two enemy machines completely out of control, in addition to those referred to above.

William Benson Craig was buried in Plot B.3, Blankenberge Communal Cemetery, Blankenberge, Belgium.

List of aerial victories

References

1896 births
1918 deaths
People from Smiths Falls
Canadian flying aces
Canadian military personnel killed in World War I
Canadian military personnel from Ontario
Canadian Expeditionary Force soldiers
Royal Regiment of Canadian Artillery personnel